The qualifying rounds of the 2013 CAF Confederation Cup were played from 16 February to 2 June 2013, to decide the eight teams which advanced to the group stage.

Draw
The draw for the preliminary, first and second qualifying rounds was held on 9 December 2012, at the CAF Headquarters in Cairo, Egypt, and the fixtures were announced by the CAF on 10 December 2012.

The following 51 teams were entered into the draw:

Byes to first round
 USM Alger
 Petro Luanda
 DC Motema Pembe
 ASEC Mimosas
 ENPPI
 Ismaily
 FAR Rabat
 Wydad AC
 Heartland
 Lobi Stars
 Al-Ahly Shendi
 CS Sfaxien
 Étoile du Sahel

Entrants to preliminary round
 Recreativo da Caála
 Mogas 90
 Gaborone United
 Rail Club du Kadiogo
 LLB Académic
 Panthère du Ndé
 Unisport Bafang
 Anges de Fatima
 Elect-Sport
 Diables Noirs
 CS Don Bosco
 The Panthers
 Dedebit

 
 US Bitam
 Gamtel
 New Edubiase United
 Séquence
 Stella Club d'Adjamé
 Gor Mahia
 Barrack Young Controllers II
 Al-Nasr
 TCO Boeny
 Onze Créateurs
 US Bougouni
 Liga Muçulmana
 Sahel

 
 Police
 Desportivo de Guadalupe
 HLM
 Anse Réunion
 Johansen
 SuperSport United
 El Nasir
 Al-Khartoum
 Mbabane Highlanders
 Azam
 AS Douanes Lomé
 Power Dynamos

Format
Qualification ties were played on a home-and-away two-legged basis. If the sides were level on aggregate after the second leg, the away goals rule was applied, and if still level, the tie proceeded directly to a penalty shoot-out (no extra time was played).

Schedule
The schedule of each round was as follows.

Preliminary round
The preliminary round included the 38 teams that did not receive byes to the first round.

|}

Gor Mahia won 5–0 on aggregate and advanced to the first round.

SuperSport United won 4–3 on aggregate and advanced to the first round.

Liga Muçulmana won 3–2 on aggregate and advanced to the first round.

AS Douanes Lomé advanced to the first round after Mogas 90 withdrew.

Rail Club du Kadiogo won 2–1 on aggregate and advanced to the first round.

LLB Académic won 2–1 on aggregate and advanced to the first round.

Panthère du Ndé won 3–1 on aggregate and advanced to the first round.

US Bitam won 17–1 on aggregate and advanced to the first round.

Dedebit won 5–2 on aggregate and advanced to the first round.

3–3 on aggregate. TCO Boeny won the penalty shoot-out and advanced to the first round.

Gamtel won 5–2 on aggregate and advanced to the first round.

1–1 on aggregate. Diables Noirs won the penalty shoot-out and advanced to the first round.

The Panthers won 3–0 on aggregate and advanced to the first round.

Recreativo da Caála won 2–1 on aggregate and advanced to the first round.

US Bougouni won 3–0 on aggregate and advanced to the first round.

Onze Créateurs won 4–1 on aggregate and advanced to the first round.

Barrack Young Controllers II won 1–0 on aggregate and advanced to the first round.

Azam won 8–1 on aggregate and advanced to the first round.

Al-Nasr won 1–0 on aggregate and advanced to the first round.

First round
The first round included 32 teams: the 19 winners of the preliminary round, and the 13 teams that received byes to this round.

|}

ENPPI won 3–0 on aggregate and advanced to the second round.

SuperSport United won 2–0 on aggregate and advanced to the second round.

Liga Muçulmana won 8–4 on aggregate and advanced to the second round.

Wydad AC won 4–1 on aggregate and advanced to the second round.

ASEC Mimosas won 3–2 on aggregate and advanced to the second round.

LLB Académic won 2–1 on aggregate and advanced to the second round.

USM Alger won 4–2 on aggregate and advanced to the second round.

US Bitam advanced to the second round after Heartland arrived late for the second leg, as per ruling made by the CAF.

Al-Ahly Shendi won 1–0 on aggregate and advanced to the second round.

Ismaily won 4–2 on aggregate and advanced to the second round.

CS Sfaxien won 7–3 on aggregate and advanced to the second round.

Diables Noirs won 6–1 on aggregate and advances to the second round.

Recreativo da Caála won 6–0 on aggregate and advanced to the second round.

Étoile du Sahel won 5–3 on aggregate and advanced to the second round.

Azam won 2–1 on aggregate and advanced to the second round.

FAR Rabat won 2–1 on aggregate and advanced to the second round.

Second round
The second round included the 16 winners of the first round.

|}

ENPPI won 3–1 on aggregate and advanced to the play-off round.

3–3 on aggregate. Liga Muçulmana won on the away goals rule and advanced to the play-off round.

1–1 on aggregate. LLB Académic won the penalty shoot-out and advanced to the play-off round.

US Bitam won 3–0 on aggregate and advanced to the play-off round.

0–0 on aggregate. Ismaily won the penalty shoot-out and advanced to the play-off round.

CS Sfaxien won 4–2 on aggregate and advanced to the play-off round.

Étoile du Sahel won 7–2 on aggregate and advanced to the play-off round.

FAR Rabat won 2–1 on aggregate and advanced to the play-off round.

Play-off round
The play-off round included 16 teams: the eight winners of the Confederation Cup second round and the eight losers of the Champions League second round. The winners of each tie advanced to the group stage.

The draw for the play-off round was held on 7 May 2013, 12:00 UTC+2, at the CAF Headquarters in Cairo, Egypt. The winners of the Confederation Cup second round were drawn against the losers of the Champions League second round, with the former hosting the second leg. Four ties contained a seeded loser of the Champions League second round (Pot A) and an unseeded winner of the Confederation Cup second round (Pot B), and the other four ties contained a seeded winner of the Confederation Cup second round (Pot C) and an unseeded loser of the Champions League second round (Pot D).

The following 16 teams were entered into the draw:

Pot A
 TP Mazembe
 ES Sétif
 FUS Rabat
 Stade Malien

Pot B
 US Bitam
 FAR Rabat
 LLB Académic
 Liga Muçulmana

Pot C
 CS Sfaxien
 ENPPI
 Ismaily
 Étoile du Sahel

Pot D
 JSM Béjaïa
 CA Bizertin
 Enugu Rangers
 Saint George

|}

Stade Malien won 6–0 on aggregate and advanced to the group stage.

CS Sfaxien advanced to the group stage after Enugu Rangers, which had originally won 1–0 on aggregate, was ruled by the CAF to have fielded an ineligible player in the second leg and thus disqualified.

FUS Rabat won 4–3 on aggregate and advanced to the group stage.

CA Bizertin won 3–1 on aggregate and advanced to the group stage.

2–2 on aggregate. ES Sétif won the penalty shoot-out and advanced to the group stage.

Étoile du Sahel won 4–3 on aggregate and advanced to the group stage.

TP Mazembe won 5–2 on aggregate and advanced to the group stage.

3–3 on aggregate. Saint George won on the away goals rule and advanced to the group stage.

References

External links

1